Ninaview is an unincorporated community in Bent County, Colorado, United States.  The U.S. Post Office at Las Animas (ZIP Code 81054) now serves Ninaview postal addresses.

A post office called Ninaview was established in 1915, and remained in operation until 1965. The community derives its name from one Nina Jones, the daughter of a local merchant. Donald Alan Johnston restored several buildings in the late 2000s and installed an amateur observatory on the site.  Astronomy is favorable here due to low external light sources.

Geography 
Ninaview is located at  (37.647675,-103.240414).

References

Unincorporated communities in Bent County, Colorado
Unincorporated communities in Colorado